Indian Point Township is one of twenty-one townships in Knox County, Illinois, USA.  As of the 2010 census, its population was 1,554 and it contained 716 housing units.

Geography

Cities, towns, villages
 Abingdon (south third)
 St. Augustine

Cemeteries
The township contains these two cemeteries: Boydston-Dawdy and Hunt.

Airports and landing strips
 Murks Strip
 Wolfords Airport

Demographics

School districts
 Abingdon Community Unit School District 217
 Avon Community Unit School District 176

Political districts
 Illinois's 17th congressional district
 State House District 74
 State Senate District 37

References
 
 United States Census Bureau 2009 TIGER/Line Shapefiles
 United States National Atlas

External links
 City-Data.com
 Illinois State Archives
 Township Officials of Illinois

Townships in Knox County, Illinois
Galesburg, Illinois micropolitan area
Townships in Illinois